David Marlais Jenner Warren (born 11 February 1956) is a male retired British middle-distance runner. Warren competed in the men's 800 metres at the 1980 Summer Olympics, reaching the final. He represented England in the 800 metres event, at the 1978 Commonwealth Games in Edmonton, Alberta, Canada. Domestically, he ran for Epsom and Ewell Harriers.

References

External links
 

1956 births
Living people
Athletes (track and field) at the 1978 Commonwealth Games
Athletes (track and field) at the 1980 Summer Olympics
Olympic athletes of Great Britain
Athletes from London
English male middle-distance runners
Commonwealth Games competitors for England